William C. Weldon (born November 26, 1948) is a former chairman of Johnson & Johnson, He was the eighth chairman in Johnson & Johnson's history of more than one hundred years.

Early life and education
He was born in Brooklyn, New York. His parents were a Broadway stagehand and a costume designer. He received a Bachelor of Arts degree in biology from Quinnipiac University in 1971.

Career
He spent his entire working life at Johnson & Johnson.  He joined the company as a sales representative for the McNeil Pharmaceutical division in 1971 and eventually became the head of Johnson & Johnson's Ethicon Endo-Surgery business in 1992.  He became the head of Johnson & Johnson's pharmaceutical operations in 1998 and then became the company's chief executive officer (CEO) in 2002.  As CEO, Weldon engineered some of the largest acquisitions in the company's history including the purchase of Alza and Pfizer's consumer-health product line.

In 2009, he earned a total compensation of $22,830,834, which included a base salary of $1,802,500, a cash bonus of $12,831,146, stock awards of $2,762,532, option awards of $5,238,069, and other compensation of $196,587. In 2011, The New York Times named him on its list of "The Worst C.E.O.'s of 2011" for the increased number of Johnson & Johnson product recalls under his leadership. Additionally, as of 2013, his story was a case study at the Leadership & Corporate Accountability course at Harvard Business School.

In Weldon's first full year as the company's CEO, total revenues increased from $32.3 billion to $36.3 billion and net earnings from $5.7 billion to $6.6 billion. In 2011, his last full year as CEO, revenues were $44.7 billion and net earnings were $9.7 billion.

Weldon retired as chairman of Johnson & Johnson on December 28, 2012, and was reported to receive $143.5 million in retirement pay.

Board memberships
He also sits on the JPMorgan Chase & Co. board of directors, the HeartFlow board of directors, the ExxonMobil board of directors, the Fairfax Financial board of directors, and the Quinnipiac University board of trustees.

References

1948 births
20th-century American businesspeople
21st-century American businesspeople
American chairpersons of corporations
American chief executives of manufacturing companies
Businesspeople from New Jersey
Businesspeople from New York City
Chief executives in the pharmaceutical industry
Directors of JPMorgan Chase
Johnson & Johnson people
Living people
People from Brooklyn
People from New Brunswick, New Jersey
Quinnipiac University alumni
Directors of ExxonMobil